Rancho Punta de los Reyes Sobrante was a  Mexican land grant in present-day western Marin County, California, given by Governor Manuel Micheltorena in 1843 to Antonio Maria Osio. The name means "Leftover of Point Reyes Ranch". It comprised much of what is now western Marin County and the Point Reyes National Seashore.

History

Antonio Maria Osio
Antonio Maria Osio (1800–1878) was born in and died in Mexico. Osio married Dolores Argüello, sister of Luis Antonio Argüello, the first governor of California. In 1838, Osio settled in Monterey. In 1839, Governor Alvarado granted Osio, Angel Island, on the condition that Osio would set aside part of the island for a fort. However, Osio never took up residence there. In 1839, Osio bought Rancho Punta de los Reyes from Joseph Snook (1798–1848), and sought about acquiring the adjacent eleven square league Rancho Punta de los Reyes Sobrante, which Governor Micheltorena granted him in 1843. Osio was also the grantee of the six square league Rancho Aguas Frias given by Governor Micheltorena in 1844.

After Osio was granted Rancho Punta de los Reyes Sobrante, he built a few structures, but didn’t spend much time there. He moved his family to San Rafael. In 1843, when Rafael Garcia moved onto part of the neighboring Rancho Punta de los Reyes of James Richard Berry; Berry, in turn, moved west onto a portion of Osio’s Rancho Punta de los Reyes Sobrante. Though Osio protested this incursion onto his land with the authorities in Monterey, nothing ever came of it.

In 1846, during the Mexican–American War, Osio fled to Honolulu, where he lived until 1849. After returning to Monterey in 1850, Osio sold his Rancho Punta de los Reyes Sobrante to Andrew Randall, who also bought Rancho Punta de los Reyes, and Rancho Aguas Frias. Osio returned to Mexico in 1852. With his second wife, Narcisa Florencia Soto, he had thirteen children. He died in San José del Cabo in 1878.

Andrew Randall
Andrew Randall (1819–1856), a native of Rhode Island, came to California on the U.S.S. Portsmouth in 1846. Randall was a geologist with medical training. He founded, and was elected chairman of the California Academy of Sciences. However he had stretched his credit to the limit, and Randall could not or would not pay immediately. Joseph Hetherington a creditor undertook to force payment by hounding him on every occasion with insults and threats. Hetherington fatally shot Randall in a San Francisco hotel on July 24, 1856, and the Committee of Vigilance hanged Hetherington July 29, 1856.

With the cession of California to the United States following the Mexican–American War, the 1848 Treaty of Guadalupe Hidalgo provided that the land grants would be honored. As required by the Land Act of 1851, a claim for Rancho Punta de los Reyes Sobrante was filed with the Public Land Commission in 1852, and the grant was patented to Andrew Randall in 1860.

See also
Ranchos of California
List of Ranchos of California
Golden Gate National Recreation Area

References

External links 
 Finding Aid to the Antonio María Osio Papers, 1823-1853 at The Bancroft Library

Punta de los Reyes Sobrante
Punta de los Reyes Sobrante
Golden Gate National Recreation Area
West Marin
Punta
History of the San Francisco Bay Area